Freigné is a former commune in the Loire-Atlantique department in western France. Before 1 January 2018, it was part of the Maine-et-Loire department. On 1 January 2018, it was merged into the new commune of Vallons-de-l'Erdre.

References 

Former communes of Maine-et-Loire
Geography of Loire-Atlantique
Populated places disestablished in 2018